The Beretta Model 1934 is an Italian compact, semi-automatic pistol which was issued as the service pistol of the Royal Italian Army beginning in 1934. It is chambered for the 9mm Corto, more commonly known as the .380 ACP.

History and usage
Armi Beretta SpA of Gardone Val Trompia has a history in firearms manufacturing reaching back to 1526, when they were established as a maker of barrels. But it was not until 1915 that, responding to the needs of the military during World War I, they produced their first pistol, the model 1915. Beretta has become one of the world's largest pistol makers and the model 1934 (M1934) was their most numerous product in the World War II era.

It was designed and purpose-built for the Italian armed forces. In the early 1930s, the Italian army was impressed by the Walther PP pistol. Beretta did not want to lose a big military contract to their German competitor and designed the M1934 for the Italian Army which accepted it in 1937. This model was followed by the Beretta M1935, which was similar to the M1934 in most respects, except that it fired a .32 ACP (7.65 mm Browning) cartridge.

Pistols made during the Fascist Era are marked with their year of manufacture in two forms: the conventional Julian date in Arabic numerals and the date in the Fascist Era in Roman numerals. The Fascist calendar commenced on 28 October 1922, so a pistol from 1937 may carry either "XV" or "XVI" as its Fascist year. Pistols taken by the armed forces usually exhibit acceptance marks stamped into the frame on the left just above the grip: "RE" (Regio Esercito) for the army, "RM" (Regia Marina) for the navy, or "RA" (Regia Aeronautica) for the Air Force, always in the form of an Eagle wearing a Royal Crown for the Royal air force. Police pistols may be marked "PS" (Pubblica Sicurezza). The Romanian military, at the time an Axis power, also purchased model 1934 (and 1935) pistols. The calibre marking appears as 9 mm Scurt (short in Romanian) rather than 9 mm Corto. Romanian Army M1934's differ from Italian M1934's in that the Romanian pistols use the Russian sight picture, where the Italian pistols use the standard sight picture used by Western armies.

An M1934, serial number 606824, was used by Nathuram Godse in the 1948 assassination of Mahatma Gandhi. The pistol, manufactured in 1934, was carried by an officer during Italy's invasion of Abyssinia and subsequently taken by a British officer as a war trophy. It is not known how it came to India, but Godse was given the unlicensed firearm by a co-conspirator.

Design 
Fitted with the characteristic Beretta open slide, the M1934 has a very reliable feeding and extraction cycle; the elongated slot in the top of the slide acts as the ejection port. It is made with relatively few parts and very simple to maintain. The M1934 is very robust in construction with a long service life if properly maintained.

9mm Corto (.380 ACP) is less powerful than most other military service pistol cartridges, such as 9mm Parabellum or .45 ACP. The magazine capacity is only 7 rounds. When the empty magazine is removed it no longer holds the slide back. The slide will come forward and close the gun unless it is held open by application of the safety, a separate operation, and this slows down the reloading of the pistol.

Service
 
  – Royal Italian Army
  – under designation Pistole 671(i)
  – 1,400 examples imported from Italy, used by home front troops from 1943.
 
 : People's Movement for the Liberation of Azawad
  - Romanian Royal Army
  Yugoslav Partisans (captured pistols)
  - Yugoslav National Army

Production
From 1934 to 1992, about 1,080,000 units were produced globally.

See also
 Beretta M1935

References

External links

Homepage of Beretta
Beretta 1934 pictures and information in Italian

Beretta firearms
M1934
World War II infantry weapons of Italy
.380 ACP semi-automatic pistols
Military equipment introduced in the 1930s